Peggy Guggenheim: Art Addict is a 2015 American documentary film directed by Lisa Immordino Vreeland about art collector Peggy Guggenheim. The film premiered on April 20, 2015 at the Tribeca Film Festival.

Clips from Maya Deren's unfinished film The Witch's Cradle (1943) are featured in this documentary, since Deren made the film with Marcel Duchamp at Guggenheim's Art of This Century gallery.

Reception
The film received very positive reviews. On Rotten Tomatoes, the film has a 94% rating based on 16 reviews, with an average rating of 6.8/10. Metacritic reports a 65 out of 100 rating, based on 7 critics, indicating "generally favorable reviews".

References

External links
 
 
 
 
 Brian Boucher, ArtNetNews (April 20, 2015)
 Vadim Razov, Lisa Vreeland interview at Filmmaker magazine (April 21, 2015)
 Jay Weissberg, Variety (May 5, 2015)
 Steven Saito, Lisa Vreeland interview at Moveable Fest (May 6, 2015)

2015 films
2015 documentary films
American documentary films
Documentary films about the visual arts
Documentary films about women
Guggenheim family
2010s English-language films
2010s American films